The 2022 Marist Red Foxes football team represented Marist College  as a member of the Pioneer Football League (PFL) during the 2022 NCAA Division I FCS football season. The Red Foxes were led by 30th-year head coach Jim Parady and played their home games at Tenney Stadium at Leonidoff Field.

Previous season

The Red Foxes finished the 2021 season with a record 5–5, 5–3 in PFL play to finish in a tie for fifth place.

Schedule

Game summaries

Georgetown

Columbia

at Drake

St. Thomas (MN)

at Stetson

Dayton

at Butler

Presbyterian

at Morehead State

Valparaiso

at Bucknell

References

Marist
Marist Red Foxes football seasons
Marist Red Foxes football